H. rosea may refer to:
 Haliotis rosea, the black abalone, a sea snail species
 Hechtia rosea, a plant species
 Hatiora rosea, a synonym of Schlumbergera rosea, an epiphytic species of cactus

Synonyms
 Hyphelia rosea, a synonym for Trichothecium roseum

See also
 Rosea (disambiguation)